Gabriel González may refer to:

 Gabriel González Videla (1898–1980), Chilean politician
 Gabriel González (referee) (born 1942), Paraguayan football referee
 Gabriel González (Mexican footballer) (born 1988), Mexican footballer
 Gabriel González (Paraguayan footballer) (born 1961), Paraguayan footballer
 Gabriel Horacio González (born 1980), Argentine footballer
 Gabriel Gonzalez Pereyra (1789–1868), Dominican priest, Bajacalifornio guerrilla in Mexican–American War
 Gabe González, Major League Baseball pitcher